Tonny Azevedo (born 9 August 1969) is a Brazilian former cyclist. He competed in the individual road race at the 1992 Summer Olympics.

References

External links
 

1969 births
Living people
Brazilian male cyclists
Brazilian road racing cyclists
Olympic cyclists of Brazil
Cyclists at the 1992 Summer Olympics
Place of birth missing (living people)